Masterda Surya Sen  is a station of the Kolkata Metro. It is located in Bansdroni area.

The Metro Station is named in the memory of Surya Sen.

History

Construction

The station

Structure
Masterda Surya Sen elevated metro station is situated on the Kolkata Metro Line 1 of Kolkata Metro.

Station layout

Connections

Bus
Bus route number 80A, 205, 205A, 228, SD5, S112 (Mini), S113 (Mini), AC6, S6A, S7 etc. serve the station.

See also

Kolkata
List of Kolkata Metro stations
Transport in Kolkata
Kolkata Metro Rail Corporation
Kolkata Suburban Railway
Kolkata Monorail
Trams in Kolkata
Garia
E.M. Bypass
List of rapid transit systems
List of metro systems

References

External links

 
 
 Official Website for line 1
 UrbanRail.Net – descriptions of all metro systems in the world, each with a schematic map showing all stations.

Kolkata Metro stations
Railway stations opened in 2009
Railway stations in Kolkata